Laxmikant Bajpai (born 20 July 1951) is an Indian politician and former State President of BJP's Uttar Pradesh unit. He was elected four times as member of the Uttar Pradesh Legislative Assembly from Meerut assembly constituency.

Education

He studied B.Sc. from Meerut College, Meerut and later obtained a BAMS degree from Rishikul Ayurveda College, Haridwar (now Uttarakhand Ayurved University - Rishikul Campus, Haridwar).

Student politics 

He was the General Secretary of the Student Union in his college days. During this tenure Laxmikant protested in front of many senior leaders and succeeded in obtaining government aids and management for all the Ayurvedic colleges of the state.

Later politics 
In 1977 he became the President of Yuva Morcha ( Youth Cell) of Janata Party. During 1980-87 he was District General Secretary of BJP Meerut. 1984-86 he was the vice president of BJP Yuva Morch in Uttar Pradesh. He is an active legislator as well and prominently takes part in the legislative debates. He had the membership of many committees of Uttar Pradesh Legislative Assembly.

He is noted for his honesty and austere lifestyle and is still seen riding his scooter. He was reelected as the president of BJP Uttar Pradesh in December 2012 on account of his excellent track record.

After his appointment as the president, the BJP has recorded a landslide victory in the Municipal Elections by collecting 10 out of the 12 mayor seats and an increased vote percentage. During his ongoing tenure BJP has also won Kannauj Civic Polls.

Experts believe that if given a free hand Bajpai on account of his clean image, effective management and contact with workers will lead BJP to regain its lost glory in Uttar Pradesh. The organizational and political skills of Bajpai worked well for the BJP when the party won 71 out of the 80 seats in Uttar Pradesh in the General elections 2014, which is by far its best total.

References

Politicians from Meerut
Living people
Uttar Pradesh MLAs 2002–2007
Bharatiya Janata Party politicians from Uttar Pradesh
1951 births
Janata Party politicians